Dvir Abramovich (born 1971) is an Israeli-Australian Jewish studies academic, columnist, and editor. Abramovich is the chairman of the Anti-Defamation Commission (ADC), a former division of B'nai B'rith in Melbourne, and director of the Program for Jewish Culture and Society at The University of Melbourne. Abramovich's areas of study are the Hebrew language, Israel and Holocaust studies.

Career

Education 
Abramovich attended Monash University where he earned his undergraduate degrees in Arts and Law. In 1995 he earned an MA in Jewish Studies and in 1999 a PhD from The University of Melbourne. He won the A.D. Hallam Prize for excellence in Hebrew studies in 1992.

Academia 
Abramovich began teaching Hebrew language and literature at The Centre for Jewish History and Culture at the University of Melbourne. He was appointed Centre Director in 2006. While at the university, Abramovich has taught a range of subjects including Hebrew language at various levels as well Introduction to Modern Jewish Culture, Israeli Film, A History of Israel, A History of the Arab Israeli conflict, "Jerusalem in Jewish Literature", "Reading the Holocaust" and "Israel: Conflicts and Culture". He has helped foster links between Israeli and Australian tertiary institutions.

Abramovich has served as editor of the Australian Journal of Jewish Studies (from 2002 to 2010) and as president of the Australian Association for Jewish Studies.

An area of interest are the works of Israeli author Amos Oz, Abramovich nominated Oz for an honorary Doctor of Letters which the writer was awarded at The University of Melbourne in August 2011.

He has authored a number of books. He has been co-editor of the 2008 book Testifying to the Holocaust and author of Back to the Future: Israeli Literature of the 1980s and 1990s, as well as Hebrew Classics: A Journey Through Israel Timeless Prose and Poetry

Anti-Defamation Commission 

Abramovich is the chairman of the community group Anti-Defamation Commission (ADC), whose purview is to fight all racism and hate, although Abramovich has shifted the focus of the organisation to Antisemitism, Holocaust trivialization and Israel advocacy. Originally, the ADC was a division of B'nai B'rith in Melbourne. However, the organisation since became an independent entity.

Commonly, Abramovich's activism involves protesting  perceived actions that exploits or trivialises the legacy and memory of the Holocaust and its victims. Abramovich has been a regularly speaks out against Holocaust trivialisation and any perceived exploitation for ideological and artistic purposes. He has criticised the tendency to use the Holocaust as material for Hollywood films, and opposes the use of Holocaust imagery by artists and comedians. Abramovich has objected to the use of Holocaust imagery by comedians.

In one instance, Abramovich took issue with a skit by John Safran on his 2009 show Race Relations in which the presenter made out in Anne Frank's attic with his supposed girlfriend Katherine Hicks, whom Safran described as a "A Blonde haired Aryan". Abramovich wrote that "Safran's exploitative approach drains the Holocaust of its tragic context (the death camps, the starvation, the shootings, the burning of bodies, the mounds of hair, shoes and glasses)". Another comedic stunt by Safran that Abramovich reacted to was a mock-gassing of Holocaust denier David Irving. Abramovich saying "Why didn't anyone tell him (Safran)... that there was no humour to be mined from atrocity, that trivialising genocide for silly comic pay-off is inexcusable?"

In 2017, Justice Michael Kirby compared the same sex marriage plebiscite to aspects of the Nazi regime. On this matter, Abramovich was at odds with the Executive Council of Australian Jewry. Abramovich responded to Kirby that "invoking such inappropriate and offensive analogies to advance any agenda undermines the historical truth and the meaning of the Holocaust, and only serves to trivialise the extermination of six million Jews and millions of others, which, as we know, included gay people." while ECAJ responded that Abramovich's views were a "misconstruction of Justice Kirby’s comments in the media and was manifestly unwarranted." Abramovich responded by criticising the ECAJ for increasing divisions in the community.

Abramovich and the Anti-Defamation Commission under his leadership have been criticised for focusing too much on defend the Israeli government against anti-Zionists rather than for its original mission of challenging racism and bigotry. One of the critics, the Australian Jewish Democratic Society, have also alleged that Abramovich has used his position in the ADC for self-aggrandisement.

Other activities 
Abramovich has been a columnist at The Australian Jewish News since 2001, authoring the Counterpunch column. He has also contributed opinion pieces for both Fairfax and News Ltd publications.

Abramovich is notable within the Jewish community and at times has been asked to speak at communal events, such as the Melbourne Writers Festival, Melbourne Film Festival as well as being interviewed at times on ABC Radio.

Published works

Books

Chapters and articles

See also 
 Ernie Friedlander - B'nai B'rith anti-racism activist in Sydney

References 

1971 births
20th-century Israeli Jews
21st-century Israeli Jews
Israeli people of Russian-Jewish descent
Israeli emigrants to Australia
Australian people of Russian-Jewish descent
Jewish Australian writers
Jewish Israeli writers
Living people
Monash University alumni
University of Melbourne alumni
Academic staff of the University of Melbourne
Presidents of the Australian Association for Jewish Studies